RB-3007  is an orally active analogue of RB-101. It acts as an enkephalinase inhibitor, which is used in scientific research.

See also 
 RB-101 - enkephalinase inhibitor that produces analgesia without respiratory depression
 D/DL-Phenylalanine - D-phenylalanine blockage of enkephalin degradation may be responsible for the reputed analgesic effect of DL-Phenylalanine
 Racecadotril - an antidiarrheal drug which acts as a peripheral enkephalinase inhibitor
 Ecadotril - a neutral endopeptidase inhibitor

References

Enkephalinase inhibitors
Organophosphates